The 1992 Suusamyr earthquake occurred at 02:04 UTC on 19 August near Toluk in the border area of Kyrgyzstan. The shock had a surface wave magnitude of 7.5 and a maximum felt intensity of IX (Violent) on the Mercalli intensity scale. It was a result of reverse faulting. The death toll from the event amounted to about 75, including 14 people who were killed by landslides.

See also
 List of earthquakes in Kyrgyzstan
 List of earthquakes in 1992

References

Further reading

External links

Suusamyr Earthquake, 1992
Earthquakes in Tajikistan
Earthquakes in Uzbekistan
Earthquakes in Kyrgyzstan
Earthquakes in Kazakhstan
August 1992 events in Asia
1992 disasters in Kazakhstan 
1992 disasters in Kyrgyzstan 
1992 disasters in Tajikistan
1992 disasters in Uzbekistan 
1992 disasters in Asia